For television in the United Kingdom, Live TV Bingo is a British television game show.

Presenters

TV Bingo has a team of regular presenters. They include Claire Anstey, Richie Litchfield, Stuart Stone, Paul Metcalfe, Syritta Spearring, Claira Hermet and many more with a different presenter every 30 minutes. The programme's mascot was a panda called Bingo B. Bear.

Method of Play

Chips are placed on the table by means of a telephone menu.

TV Bingo is a fixed odds betting game similar to the lottery or Keno.

Contestants choose 6 numbers using their telephone by calling the number on screen during the show and follow the prompts. They can pick six numbers of their own or simply go for a "Lucky Dip" where the six numbers are randomly selected by the computer.

Once a contestant has registered they can buy a TV Bingo ticket for anything from a minimum of £1 up to a maximum of £10. Once they have selected and confirmed their numbers they are in for the next draw. If they get in early enough they should also see their numbers and their player name appear on screen.

Every two minutes "Get ready to Jumble" where the winnings numbers are revealed by the computer. After this a list of the winners will appear on screen.

Below is a list of the possible payouts for the game to give some examples of what a contestant can win.

Pay outs from a £1 ticket
1 no = £1
2 no's = £2 
3 no's = £20 
4 no's = £100 
5 no's = £1000 
6 no's = £10,000

Pay outs from a £10 Ticket
1 no = £10
2 no = £20
3 no = £100
4 no = £1000
5 no = £10,000
6 no = £100,000

Winners on TV Bingo

After each round, every winner from that game is displayed on screen, along with the amount of money won.

External links 
 Live TV Bingo T&Cs 
 Live TV Bingo Odds & How to play 
 GamingTelly Forum containing pictures, discussion and downloads from the show.

British non-fiction web series
Television channels in the United Kingdom
2006 British television series debuts
2006 British television series endings